The 13th Biathlon World Championships were held in 1974 in Minsk, Belarus, at that time part of the Soviet Union.

Men's results

20 km individual

10 km sprint

4 × 7.5 km relay

Medal table

References

1974
Biathlon World Championships
International sports competitions hosted by the Soviet Union
1974 in Soviet sport
February 1974 sports events in Europe
March 1974 sports events in Europe
1974 in Belarus
Biathlon competitions in the Soviet Union
Biathlon competitions in Belarus
Sports competitions in Minsk
1970s in Minsk